is a passenger railway station in located in the town of Nachikatsuura, Higashimuro District, Wakayama Prefecture, Japan, operated by West Japan Railway Company (JR West).

Lines

Station layout
The station consists of a two opposed side platforms connected by a footbridge. The station is unattended.

Platforms

Adjacent stations

|-
!colspan=5|West Japan Railway Company (JR West)

History
Shimosato Station opened on July 18, 1935. With the privatization of the Japan National Railways (JNR) on April 1, 1987, the station came under the aegis of the West Japan Railway Company.

Passenger statistics
In fiscal 2019, the station was used by an average of 72 passengers daily (boarding passengers only).

Surrounding Area
 Shimosato Kofun (National Historic Site)
Tamanoura beach
Nachikatsuura Town Hall Shimosato Branch Office
Shimosato Waterway Observatory, Maritime Security Headquarters, 5th Division
Nachikatsuura Municipal Shimosato Junior High School
Nachikatsuura Municipal Shimosato Elementary School

See also
List of railway stations in Japan

References

External links

 Shimosato Station (West Japan Railway) 

Railway stations in Wakayama Prefecture
Railway stations in Japan opened in 1935
Nachikatsuura